Xavier Bichat (1771–1802) was a French anatomist and pathologist, known as the father of modern histology.

Bichat may also refer to:
Bichat's fat pad
Bichat–Claude Bernard Hospital
250606 Bichat, minor planet